Torestorp is a locality situated in Mark Municipality, Västra Götaland County, Sweden. It had 419 inhabitants in 2010.

Sports
The following sports clubs are located in Torestorp:

 Torestorp/Älekulla FF

References 

Populated places in Västra Götaland County
Populated places in Mark Municipality